Andrew George Robert Nelson (born 16 September 1997) is an English professional footballer who plays as a striker for  club Darlington. He began his career with Sunderland, spending time on loan at Hartlepool United, for whom he made his Football League debut, Harrogate Town, Falkirk and Darlington. After 18 months with Dundee, he spent a season with Torquay United during which injury prevented him from playing at all, returned to Darlington in 2021 until injury again put a stop to his career, and rejoined the club in 2023.

Early and personal life
Nelson was born in Stockton-on-Tees, County Durham, and attended King James I Academy in Bishop Auckland.

Career

Sunderland
He joined Sunderland's academyin preference to those of Newcastle United and Middlesbroughat the age of seven and took up a two-year scholarship with the club in July 2014. In 2016, he signed a two-year professional contract which was later extended for a further year.

Nelson made two substitute appearances for Sunderland's U23 team in the 2016–17 EFL Trophy, a competition involving senior teams from third- and fourth-tier clubs together with under-age teams from the higher divisions. He moved on loan to Hartlepool United on 31 January 2017, and made his club and Football League debut in the starting eleven at home to Yeovil Town four days later. He made the cross from which Hartlepool opened the scoring, and then conceded the penalty from which Yeovil secured a 1–1 draw. He kept his starting place for the next two matches, without scoring, but in the next he injured his medial knee ligaments shortly after coming on as a substitute. He returned to his parent club for treatment and rehabilitation, and played no more football that season.

In October 2017, he joined Harrogate Town of the National League North on loan for a month. According to Harrogate manager Simon Weaver, during his debut Nelson "showed a good aggressive edge to his play, he was brave and his hold-up play was good." During his loan spell he played in four National League North matches and scored once, with a close-range header in a 3–1 defeat away to Spennymoor Town.

At the start of January 2018, Nelson moved on loan to Scottish Championship club Falkirk until the end of the season. He was a fixture in the starting eleven, scoring four goals and making three assists in twelve Championship appearances, until his loan spell was cut short by injury. A fractured cheekbone forced him to miss the last month of the season.

After surgery in September on a foot injured in pre-season, Nelson eventually resumed training in November 2018. In order to regain match fitness, he signed on a month's loan for another National League North club, Darlington, in December 2018. He scored twice on debut away to Chorley, albeit in a losing cause, and finished his loan spell with six goals from five league appearances. Darlington's manager Tommy Wright praised Nelson, saying that it "[doesn't] get much better than what he did with us – six goals and two assists".

Dundee
Nelson signed a two-and-a-half-year contract with Scottish Premiership club Dundee in January 2019; the fee was undisclosed. He scored a game-winning goal on his league debut, away to Heart of Midlothian on 23 January. Dundee entered a long losing streak and were relegated to the Championship on 4 May 2019.

The 2019–20 season was prematurely ended due to the COVID-19 pandemic.

In July 2020, Nelson left Dundee by mutual agreement.

Torquay United
Later that month he signed for Torquay United. He injured a knee in a pre-season friendly, eventually had surgery once the exact problem had been established, missed the entire season, and was released at its end.

Darlington
Nelson trained with Darlington ahead of the 2021–22 season, andstill not completely fitrejoined the club on 11 August 2021. After nearly 18 months out of competitive football, he made his debut on 30 August, and scored his first goal two weeks later to secure Darlington's first point of the season with the equaliser away to Blyth Spartans. He made eight appearances before the knee problem recurred, and eventually decided to have surgery that would keep him out of the game for 15 months. On 11 May 2022, Darlington announced that Nelson had been released by the club but would later be invited back for pre-season training to help with his rehabilitation from injury.

On 3 March 2023, ten months after his release, a fully fit Nelson again signed for Darlington. He made his third debut for the Quakers the following day as a substitute. In the following game against AFC Fylde, Nelson returned to the scoresheet after scoring twice.

Career statistics

References

External links
 Profile at Sunderland A.F.C. website

1997 births
Living people
Footballers from Stockton-on-Tees
Footballers from County Durham
English footballers
Association football forwards
Sunderland A.F.C. players
Hartlepool United F.C. players
Harrogate Town A.F.C. players
Falkirk F.C. players
Darlington F.C. players
Dundee F.C. players
Torquay United F.C. players
English Football League players
National League (English football) players
Scottish Professional Football League players